Bill Wyman is the third album by Rolling Stones bassist Bill Wyman.  It was released in 1982 by A&M Records. The album reached number 55 on the UK album charts.

Unlike his previous albums, Bill Wyman is largely in the synth-pop style. The song "(Si Si) Je Suis un Rock Star" was the biggest hit single off the album. The album features guest musicians Brian Setzer, Slim Jim Phantom, Chris Rea, Dave Mattacks and Terry Taylor.

Critical reception
In a retrospective review, AllMusic rated the album four stars out of five. They noted "(Si Si) Je Suis un Rock Star", "Come Back Suzanne" and "A New Fashion" as the best songs. They praised the album: "Instead of utilizing the all-star group of backup musicians that dominated his previous solo outings, Bill Wyman found the veteran rocker handling much of the instrumentation himself, with only a rhythm section and a few guest stars pitching in. The result is a crisp, consistent sound that mixes the electronic edge of new wave with good, old-fashioned rock & roll production values."  The album is a "worthwhile listen" and concluded that "ultimately, one's level of interest in Bill Wyman will depend on their love of eccentric humor, but no one can deny that it effectively combines solid songwriting and a sleek, consistent production style."

Track listing
All tracks written by Bill Wyman, except where noted.

Personnel
Bill Wyman – lead vocals, backing vocals, bass, additional guitar, synthesizer, harmonica, design concept, photography
Terry Taylor – guitar, backing vocals
Dave Lawson – synthesizer
Dave Mattacks – drums
The Cookham Cookies, Chris Kimsey, Stuart Epps – backing vocals
with:
Brian Setzer – guitar on "Ride On Baby"
Chris Rea – guitar on "Visions"
Stephen Wyman – synthesizer on "Ride On Baby"
Bogdan Wiczling – drums on "Come Back Suzanne" and "Seventeen"
Slim Jim Phantom – drums on "Rio de Janeiro"
Bruce Rowland – drums on "(Si Si) Je Suis un Rock Star"
Annie Whitehead, Martin Drover, Mel Collins – horns on "Jump Up"

Charts

References

1982 albums
A&M Records albums
Bill Wyman albums
Albums produced by Bill Wyman
albums produced by Chris Kimsey
New wave albums by English artists